Lofa may refer to:

 Lofa County, county in Liberia
 Lofa Defense Force or LDF, a rebel group that participated in the Liberian Civil War
 Lofa River, river in Liberia
 Lofa Tatupu (Mosiula Mea'alofa "Lofa" Tatupu, born 1982), American football linebacker
 Leap of Faith Assumption, a concept of the Lean startup business development process
 The sofa car, nicknamed the lofa, built by Edd China

See also
 Loffa (radiolarian), a genus in family Pantanelliidae in order Spumellaria